is a Japanese mixed martial artist, currently fighting in the super atomweight division of Shooto, where she is the former and inaugural Shooto Super Atomweight champion. A professional competitor since 2012, Kurobe is also the former DEEP JEWELS Atomweight champion.

In June 2021, she is the #9 ranked atomweight in the world according to Sherdog.

Mixed martial arts career

DEEP JEWELS

Early career
Kurobe made her professional debut against Naomi Taniyama at JEWELS: 22nd Ring. She won the fight by a second round rear naked choke.

Kurobe made her second appearance with JEWELS at JEWELS: 23rd Ring, against Tomo Maesawa. Kurobe once again won by rear naked choke, submitting Maesawa in the first round of the bout.

Kurobe was scheduled to fight Masako Yoshida at Deep Jewels 5. She beat Yoshida by unanimous decision.

Following a first-round submission of Satomi Takano at Deep Jewels 6, Kurobe was scheduled to fight Emi Tomimatsu in the co-main event of Deep Jewels 7. Her fight with Tomimatsu was one of four quarterfinal bouts of the DEEP JEWELS Featherweight (-48 kg) Grand Prix. Kurobe won the fight by split decision, with her pressure and volume swaying two of the three judges to score the bout in her favor. Advancing to the semifinals, Kurobe faced Mei Yamaguchi at Deep Jewels 8. Kurobe lost to the eventual tournament winner by unanimous decision.

Kurobe was next scheduled to fight the former JEWELS Featherweight champion Naho Sugiyama at Deep Jewels 10. She lost the fight by unanimous decision.

Title run
Following her first two professional losses, Kurobe was scheduled to fight Hana Date at Deep Jewels 11. Kurobe won the fight by unanimous decision. In her next fight, Kurobe was scheduled to fight the second date sister, Renju Date, at Deep Jewels 12. She beat Renju by a first-round technical knockout.

Kurobe was scheduled to fight a rematch with Tomo Maesawa at Deep Jewels 13. The two had previously fought at JEWELS: 23rd Ring, with Kurobe winning by a first-round submission. Kurobe won the rematch by unanimous decision.

Kurobe was scheduled to fight Saori Ishioka in the main event of Deep Jewels 14. Kurobe beat Ishioka by unanimous decision.

DEEP JEWELS Atomweight champion
Kurobe was scheduled to fight the reigning DEEP JEWELS Atomweight champion Naho Sugiyama at Deep Jewels 15, at the age of 39. Kurobe was dominant throughout the bout, mixing in volume striking with takedown attempts. She won the fight by a unanimous decision.

Kurobe was next scheduled to fight Seo Hee Ham for the vacant Road FC Women's Atomweight title at Road FC 039. Ham won the fight by a third-round technical knockout.

Kurobe was scheduled to fight Jeong Eun Park in a non-title bout at DEEP 81 Impact. She beat Park by a unanimous decision.

Kurobe made her first title defense against Satomi Takano at Deep Jewels 19. She beat Takano by unanimous decision.

Kurobe had her second fight outside of JEWELS on September 30, 2018, when she was scheduled to fight Ayaka Hamasaki at Rizin 13. Hamasaki won the fight by a first-round submission, locking in a kimura with 15 seconds left in the round.

Kurobe was scheduled to make her second title defense in a trilogy bout with Tomo Maesawa at Deep Jewels 22. Kurobe had won their previous two encounters, winning by submission the first time and by decision the second time. Maesawa won the tightly contested bout by split decision.

Shooto

Shooto Super Atomweight tournament
Kurobe was scheduled to fight Ye Ji Lee in her Shooto debut, at Shooto 30th Anniversary Tour 6th Round. Kurobe won the fight by a second-round submission, submitting Lee with a rear naked choke at the very end of the round.

Following her victory over Lee, Kurobe was scheduled to participate in the Shooto Super Atomweight tournament, held to determine the inaugural champion. Kurobe was scheduled to fight Tanja Angerer at Shooto 30th Anniversary Tour, in the tournament quarterfinals. She beat Angerer by a second-round technical knockout, stopping her opponent with ground-and-pound near the end of round.

Advancing to the tournament semifinals, Kurobe was scheduled to fight the future DEEP JEWELS Atomweight champion Saori Oshima, at Shooto 2020 vol.3. Kurobe won the fight by a third-round technical knockout.

Shooto Super Atomweight champion
Kurobe was scheduled to face Megumi Sugimoto in the finals of the Shooto Super Atomweight tournament at Shooto 2020 Vol. 5. Despite the COVID-19 restrictions, the event was held in front of a live audience at the Korakuen Hall. Kurobe won the fight by a dominant unanimous decision, with all three judges scoring the bout 30-27 in her favor. Aside from winning the inaugural title, Kurobe was also given a 1 million yen award for winning the tournament.

Kurobe was expected to face Satomi Takano in her first title defense, at a location and date which to be determined later. The bout was later announced as the co-main event of Professional Shooto 2021 Vol. 7, which will be held on November 6, 2021. Kurobe lost the fight by unanimous decision, with scores of 49-46, 49-45 and 48-47.

Post title reign
Kurobe faced Momoka Hoshuyama, in her first fight post-title loss, at Professional Shooto 2022. Kurobe won the fight by unanimous decision, utilizing her wrestling to out-grapple Hoshuyama throughout the two round bout.

Kurobe was booked to face Seo Young Park at Shooto 2022 Vol. 7 on July 17, 2022. She won the fight by a second-round submission, forcing Park to tap with a rear-naked choke.

Kurobe faced Ayaka Watanabe on January 15, 2023 at Shooto 2023 Opening Round, losing the bout when she got knocked out in the second round.

Championships and accomplishments
DEEP JEWELS
DEEP JEWELS Atomweight Championship
One successful title defenseShootoShooto Super Atomweight Championship

Mixed martial arts record

 
|-
| Loss
| align=center| 18–7
| Ayaka Watanabe
| KO (punch)
| Shooto 2023 Opening Round
| 
| align=center|2
| align=center|2:29
| Tokyo, Japan
|
|-
| Win
| align=center| 18–6
| Seo Young Park
| Submission (rear-naked choke)
| Shooto 2022 Vol. 5
| 
| align=center| 2
| align=center| 1:34
| Bunkyō, Japan
|
|-
| Win
| align=center| 17–6
| Momoka Hoshuyama
| Decision (unanimous)
| Shooto 2022 Opening Round
| 
| align=center| 2
| align=center| 5:00
| Bunkyō, Japan
|
|-
| Loss
| align=center| 16–6
| Satomi Takano
| Decision (unanimous)
| Shooto 2021 Vol. 7
| 
| align=center| 5
| align=center| 5:00
| Tokyo, Japan
|
|-
| Win
| align=center| 16–5
| Megumi Sugimoto
| Decision (unanimous)
| Shooto 2020 Vol. 5
| 
| align=center| 5
| align=center| 5:00
| Tokyo, Japan
|
|-
| Win
| align=center| 15–5
| Saori Oshima
| TKO (punches)
| Shooto 2020 vol.3
| 
| align=center| 3
| align=center| 1:54
| Tokyo, Japan
| 
|-
| Win
| align=center| 14–5
| Tanja Angerer
| TKO (punches)
| Shooto 30th Anniversary Tour
| 
| align=center| 2
| align=center| 4:52
| Tokyo, Japan
| 
|-
| Win
| align=center| 13–5
| Ye Ji Lee
| Technical Submission (rear-naked choke)
| Shooto 30th Anniversary Tour 6th Round
| 
| align=center| 2
| align=center| 4:48
| Tokyo, Japan
|
|-
| Loss
| align=center| 12–5
| Tomo Maesawa
| Decision (split)
| Deep Jewels 22
| 
| align=center| 5
| align=center| 5:00
| Tokyo, Japan
| Loses the DEEP JEWELS Atomweight Championship
|-
| Loss
| align=center| 12–4
| Ayaka Hamasaki
| Submission (kimura)
| Rizin 13
| 
| align=center| 1
| align=center| 4:45
| Saitama, Japan
|
|-
| Win
| align=center| 12–3
| Satomi Takano
| Decision (unanimous)
| Deep Jewels 19
| 
| align=center| 5
| align=center| 5:00
| Tokyo, Japan
| Defends the DEEP JEWELS Atomweight Championship
|-
| Win
| align=center| 11–3
| Jeong Eun Park
| Decision (unanimous)
| DEEP 81 Impact
| 
| align=center| 3
| align=center| 5:00
| Tokyo, Japan
| 
|-
| Loss
| align=center| 10–3
| Seo Hee Ham
| TKO (punches)
| Road FC 039
| 
| align=center| 3
| align=center| 4:13
| Seoul, South Korea
| For the Road FC Women's Atomweight Championship
|-
| Win
| align=center| 10–2
| Naho Sugiyama
| Decision (unanimous)
| Deep Jewels 15
| 
| align=center| 5
| align=center| 5:00
| Tokyo, Japan
| Wins the DEEP JEWELS Atomweight Championship
|-
| Win
| align=center| 9–2
| Saori Ishioka
| Decision (unanimous)
| Deep Jewels 14
| 
| align=center| 3
| align=center| 5:00
| Tokyo, Japan
| 
|-
| Win
| align=center|8–2
| Tomo Maesawa
| Decision (unanimous)
| Deep Jewels 13
| 
| align=center| 2
| align=center| 5:00
| Tokyo, Japan
| 
|-
| Win
| align=center|7–2
| Renju Date
| TKO (punches)
| Deep Jewels 12
| 
| align=center| 1
| align=center| 1:29
| Tokyo, Japan
| 
|-
| Win
| align=center|6–2
| Hana Date
| Decision (unanimous)
| Deep Jewels 11
| 
| align=center| 2
| align=center| 5:00
| Tokyo, Japan
| 
|-
| Loss
| align=center|5–2
| Naho Sugiyama
| Decision (unanimous)
| Deep Jewels 10
| 
| align=center| 2
| align=center| 5:00
| Tokyo, Japan
| 
|-
| Loss
| align=center|5–1
| Mei Yamaguchi
| Decision (unanimous)
| Deep Jewels 8
| 
| align=center| 2
| align=center| 5:00
| Tokyo, Japan
| Deep Jewels Featherweight (-48 kg) Grand Prix Semifinal
|-
| Win
| align=center|5–0
| Emi Tomimatsu
| Decision (split)
| Deep Jewels 7
| 
| align=center| 2
| align=center| 5:00
| Tokyo, Japan
| Deep Jewels Featherweight (-48 kg) Grand Prix Quarterfinal
|-
| Win
| align=center|4–0
| Satomi Takano
| Technical Submission (rear-naked choke)
| Deep Jewels 6
| 
| align=center| 1
| align=center| 4:02
| Tokyo, Japan
| 
|-
| Win
| align=center|3–0
| Masako Yoshida
| Decision (unanimous)
| Deep Jewels 5
| 
| align=center| 1
| align=center| 4:02
| Tokyo, Japan
| 
|-
| Win
| align=center|2–0
| Tomo Maesawa
| Submission (rear-naked choke)
| JEWELS: 23rd Ring
| 
| align=center| 1
| align=center| 1:49
| Tokyo, Japan
| 
|-
| Win
| align=center|1–0
| Naomi Taniyama
| Submission (rear-naked choke)
| JEWELS: 23rd Ring
| 
| align=center| 2
| align=center| 1:55
| Tokyo, Japan
| 
|-

Grappling record

|-  style="background:#c5d2ea;"
| 2017-05-30|| Draw ||align=left| Emi Tomimatsu || DEEP JEWELS 16 || Tokyo, Japan || Decision (Time limit) || 2 || 5:00
|-  style="background:#cfc;"
| 2012-09-22|| Win ||align=left| Yuka Hiyama || JEWELS: 21st Ring || Tokyo, Japan || Submission (Sleeper choke) || 1 || 1:17
|-  style="background:#fbb;"
| 2012-03-03 || Loss ||align=left| Miyoko Kusaka || Jewels: 18th Ring || Tokyo, Japan || Submission (Scissor choke) || 2 || 3:17
|-
|-
| colspan=9 | Legend''':

See also
 List of female mixed martial artists
 List of current mixed martial arts champions
 List of Shooto champions

References

1977 births
Japanese female mixed martial artists
Living people
Sportspeople from Tokyo
Atomweight mixed martial artists
Mixed martial artists utilizing Brazilian jiu-jitsu
Japanese practitioners of Brazilian jiu-jitsu
Female Brazilian jiu-jitsu practitioners